Helen Mary Cherry (24 November 1915 – 27 September 2001) was an English stage, film and television actress. She was born in Worsley, Lancashire, and brought up in Harrogate, West Riding of Yorkshire.

Marriage
Whilst working at the Arts Theatre, Cherry met fellow actor Trevor Howard, whom she married on 8 September 1944; they remained married until his death in 1988. They had no children.

Selected filmography

 The Courtneys of Curzon Street (1947) – Mary Courtney
 The Mark of Cain (1947) – Mary
 For Them That Trespass (1949) – Mary Drew
 Adam and Evelyne (1949) – Moira Hannon
 Morning Departure (1950) – Helen Armstong
 They Were Not Divided (1950) – Wilhelmina
 Last Holiday (1950) – Miss Mellows
 The Woman with No Name (1950) – Sybil
 Young Wives' Tale (1951) – Mary Banning
 His Excellency (1952) – Lady Kirkman
 Castle in the Air (1952) – Boss Trent
 Three Cases of Murder (1955) – Lady Mountdrago ("Lord Mountdrago" segment)
 High Flight (1957) – Louise Dawson
 The Naked Edge (1961) – Miss Osborne
 The Devil's Agent (1962) – Countess Carla Cosimano
 Tomorrow at Ten (1963) – Robbie
 Delayed Flight (1964) – Helen Strickland
 Flipper's New Adventure (1964) – Julia
 The Charge of the Light Brigade (1968) – Lady Scarlett
 Hard Contract (1969) – Evelyn Carlson
 11 Harrowhouse (1974) – Lady Anne Bolding
 Conduct Unbecoming (1975) – Mrs. Strang
 No Longer Alone (1976) – Miss Godfrey
 Flashpoint Africa (1980) – Mrs. Barraclough
 Clash of Loyalties (1983) – Lady Cox
 Nemesis (1987) – Miss Elizabeth Temple
 The Girl in a Swing (1988) – Lady Alice
 A Ghost in Monte Carlo (1990) – Mother Superior

References

External links

 Helen Cherry Obituary in The Guardian

1915 births
2001 deaths
English film actresses
English stage actresses
English television actresses
People from Worsley
English Shakespearean actresses
20th-century English actresses
Actresses from Salford